Mar Sargis Yousip, is the Assyrian Church of the East's Bishop of Baghdad, Iraq. Born in 1950 in Baghdad, he was consecrated a bishop at the age of 17 by Mar Yosip Khnanisho on 2 March 1967 at the Mar Zaia Cathedral in Baghdad. In 2002 the bishop left for the United States and has since been unable to return to his diocese. He currently resides in exile at Modesto, California.

See also
Assyrian Church of the East
Assyrian Church of the East's Holy Synod

References

Sargis Yousip
Iraqi Assyrian people
Iraqi bishops
People from Baghdad
Iraqi emigrants to the United States
1950 births
Living people
20th-century bishops of the Assyrian Church of the East